Elections in Jharkhand are being conducted since the formation of the state in 2000, to elect the members of Jharkhand Vidhan Sabha and to the members of the lower house of the Indian parliament, the Lok Sabha. There are 81 Vidhan Sabha constituencies and 14 Lok Sabha constituencies in the state.

Major Political parties in Jharkhand 
The Bharatiya Janata Party and Jharkhand Mukti Morcha have been the most dominant parties in the state since its formation. Other major parties include Indian National Congress, Rashtriya Janata Dal, Communist Party of India (Marxist–Leninist) Liberation, Janata Dal (United) and All Jharkhand Students Union.

Lok Sabha elections 
It is worth noting that till the year 2000, Jharkhand was a part of undivided Bihar state.

Total Seats- 14

Vidhan Sabha elections

 The First assembly of Jharkhand was constituted on the basis of the Bihar state legislative assembly elections held in February, 2000.

References